

"Campeonato"

Ascenso

Pool 1

Pool 2

Semifinals

Final

 Mar del Plata Promoted to  "Campeonato"

"Estimulo"

Pool 1

Pool 2 
 UR del Centro >(Tandil) withdrew after its merging with Mar del Plata.

External links 
  Memorias de la UAR 2003
 Rugby Archive
  Francesco Volpe, Paolo Pacitti (Author), Rugby 2004, GTE Gruppo Editorale (2003)

Campeonato Argentino de Rugby
Argentina